Bonnie Siegler (born 1963) is a New York-based graphic designer. She is the founder of the design studio Eight and a Half and, before that, co-founded the design studio Number Seventeen in 1993. Her clients include Participant Media, Late Night with Seth Meyers, Saturday Night Live, HBO, Brooklyn Public Library, Maveron, Random House, The Criterion Collection, The New York Times, Nickelodeon, and the Frank Lloyd Wright Foundation.

She is also the author of two books published in 2018. Signs of Resistance: A Visual History of Protest in America and describes the efforts and art of protest from 1754 through to today. The other is Dear Client, This Book Will Teach You How to Get What You Want from Creative People, with 66 short chapters that guide the reader through different aspects of the process of working with creatives.
Both books were published by Artisan Books, a division of Workman Publishing Company.

Personal life 

Bonnie Siegler is married to filmmaker, animator, and painter Jeff Scher. They currently live in Brooklyn with their two children.

References

External links 
 Eight and a Half
 "Dear Bonnie" on Design Observer
 Image of the Studio profile
 ADC Young Guns Profile
 Studio 360 Interview on Apple iOS Design
 2paragraphs Interview
 "The New VC Arms Race: Snazzy Websites" Interview in Fast Company

American graphic designers
Women graphic designers
1963 births
Living people
People from Huntington Station, New York
Carnegie Mellon University alumni